Bonfigli is an Italian surname. Notable people with the surname include:

 Antonio Bonfigli (1806–1865), Italian painter, architect, and miniaturist
 Benedetto Bonfigli (c. 1420–1496), Italian painter 
 Emiliano Bonfigli (born 1989), Argentine footballer
 Emilio Bonfigli (1902–1987), Italian boxer

See also 
Bonfiglio

Italian-language surnames